"Heaven" is the third posthumous single by Swedish DJ Avicii, featuring vocals by singer Chris Martin of British band Coldplay. The song was released on 6 June 2019, as the third single from Avicii's posthumous studio album Tim. The song became his third single, and his second posthumously, to reach number one on Billboards Dance/Mix Show Airplay chart in its 27 July 2019 issue.

Recording 

The song was recorded with Chris Martin in 2014, at the same time they did "A Sky Full of Stars". It first premiered during Avicii's set at Future Music Festival in 2015. During the period of 2014 until 2019, there have been different versions of the song circulating the web. Finally Avicii chose the one with Chris Martin.

In 2015, Avicii premiered "Heaven" at 2015 Ultra Music Festival with a different singer, Simon Aldred, and said he thought he did the track justice. In 2016, Avicii worked on a version of "Heaven" with producer Carl Falk, now including a revamped vocal from singer Simon Aldred and electric guitars. Avicii played this version of the track during the course of 2016, until his retirement. Before his death, Tim told the Chief Executive Officer of Universal Music Sweden, Per Sundin, that he wanted to release the version with Chris Martin instead. The song was played in his memory by Nicky Romero during Kingsland Festival in 2018. As Nicky said, Tim sent to him a folder full of new music, mostly unfinished but still usable for the shows. On 27 May 2018, the song was leaked online after being played by NRJ radio.

In April 2019, it was announced that the album Tim, which Avicii was working on before his death, would include the song "Heaven" in the album, which was released on 6 June 2019.

In December 2019, "Heaven" was sung live by singer Simon Aldred at the Avicii Tribute Concert benefiting the Tim Bergling Foundation.

Music video
The lyric video was released on 6 June 2019. The music video, called a "tribute video", which used old clips of Avicii at Madagascar (following his last concert performance in 2016) was released on 24 June 2019.  In the music video, Tim was joined by his longtime producer Levan Tsikurishvili and his childhood friend Awat to have a vacation together on the island of II Saint Marie with video collections of him walking and enjoying around the island.

Remixes
On 27 July 2019, David Guetta played the remix of the song of "Heaven" at the Tomorrowland festival featuring Morten. The song was released on 23 August 2019.

Credits and personnel
Credits adapted from YouTube and Expressen.

Avicii – songwriter, producer, bass guitar, keyboards, drum programming, programming
Chris Martin – vocals, songwriter, guitar
Simon Aldred – demo vocals (2015 & 2016 versions)
Carl Falk – mixer and mastering, electric guitar (2016 demo version)
Marcus Thunberg Wessel – engineer, assistant mixer
Kevin Grainger – mixer and mastering
Julio Rodriguez Sangrador – assistant mixer and mastering
Christopher Thordson – manager
Per Sundin – designer
Neil Jacobson – designer
Nick Groff – designer
Johnny Tennander – designer

Charts

Weekly charts

Year-end charts

Certifications

References

2019 songs
Avicii songs
Songs written by Avicii
Songs written by Chris Martin
Songs released posthumously